LQR may refer to:

 Law Quarterly Review, peer-reviewed academic journal covering common law
 Linear–quadratic regulator, a theory of optimal control
 Link Quality Report, a protocol that allows two computers to connect to each other